The Regular Issues of 1922–1931 were a series of 27 U.S. postage stamps issued for general everyday use by the U.S. Post Office. Unlike the definitives previously in use, which presented only a Washington or Franklin image, each of these definitive stamps depicted a different president or other subject, with Washington and Franklin each confined to a single denomination. The series not only restored the historical tradition of honoring multiple presidents on U.S. Postage but extended it. Offering the customary presidential portraits of the martyred Lincoln and Garfield, the war hero Grant, and the founding fathers Washington and Jefferson, the series also memorialized some of the more recently deceased presidents, beginning with Hayes, McKinley, Cleveland and Roosevelt. Later, the deaths of Harding, Wilson and Taft all prompted additions to the presidential roster of Regular Issue stamps, and Benjamin Harrison's demise (1901) was belatedly deemed recent enough to be acknowledged as well, even though it had already been recognized in the Series of 1902. The Regular Issues also included other notable Americans, such as Martha Washington and Nathan Hale—and, moreover, was the first definitive series since 1869 to offer iconic American pictorial images: these included the Statue of Liberty, the Capitol Building and others. The first time (1869) that images other than portraits of statesmen had been featured on U.S. postage, the general public disapproved, complaining that the scenes were no substitute for images of presidents and Franklin.  However, with the release of these 1922 regular issues, the various scenes—which included the Statue of Liberty, the Lincoln Memorial and even an engraving of an American Buffalo—prompted no objections. To be sure, this series (unlike the 1869 issues) presented pictorial images only on the higher-value stamps; the more commonly used denominations, of 12 cents and lower, still offered the traditional portraits.

This series of postage stamps was the fourth to be printed by the Bureau of Engraving and Printing, in Washington D.C.. Postal history "firsts" in these Regular Issues included the first fractional-value postage stamps, the first stamp to pay tribute to the Statue of Liberty and the first postage stamps to honor Warren G. Harding, Rutherford B. Hayes, Grover Cleveland, Theodore Roosevelt, Woodrow Wilson and William Howard Taft.

Upon release these Regular Issues were initially printed on the flat-plate printing press, into which sheets were inserted one at a time, but shortly thereafter they were produced with the Stickney rotary press which printed images with slightly less quality and clarity but which allowed for the dramatic increases in production rates, as printing paper was fed into the press from continuous rolls of paper.  The Regular Issues were released over a nine-year period and can be found with three sizes, or gauges, of perforations which are used in the identification of the particular series for which a given stamp belongs.

Subject and design
The definitive postage stamps of 1922, also known by collectors as the Fourth Bureau Issue, were issued in denominations ranging from -cent to 5-dollars with a corresponding subject and color for each. This would be the second issuance of definitive stamps released by the U.S. Post Office where the name of the subject was spelled out in print, unlike the Washington-Franklins previously issued where the respective subjects were presented in image form only. All the 1922–1931 denominations between 1-cent and 15-cents were printed in colors identical—or nearly identical—to the colors used for their counterparts in the preceding Washington-Franklin series (new colors, of course, had to be chosen for the 1-cent and 14-cent values, which had not previously been offered). Of the higher-denomination stamps, however, only the 50-cent value retained its Washington-Franklin color (the $2 stamp employed the same blue used for pre-Washington-Franklin $2 designs between 1894 and 1918).

The first stamp of the Regular Issues series was issued on October 4, 1922, the 11-cent Rutherford B. Hayes stamp, which also marked the hundredth anniversary of Hayes's birth. The issue was first released in Hayes' hometown of Fremont, Ohio, and in Washington D.C. Thus began the practice of issuing a new stamp on a specific day and in a particular city. The Hayes stamp is regarded by many collectors as the beginning of modern First Day Cover collecting. Benjamin Franklin and George Washington were traditionally depicted on the most commonly used stamps, the 1- and 2-cent issues, typically used for post cards and 1st class letters. One distinctive design feature of this series is that the stamps valued at 17 cents and higher appear in landscape format, distinguishing them from the less expensive stamps (15 cents and lower), which conform to normal portrait-orientation. Here, the Post Office amplified an idea introduced in the previous Washington-Franklin issues, where landscape format had been used for the $2 and $5 stamps.  In the 1922-1931 issues, the corner ornamentation designed for the landscape issues is larger and more elaborate than—yet still aesthetically consonant with—the ornament employed on the lower values.

The Regular Issues were issued in three basic forms, consisting of sheet-stamps, coil-stamps (long strips of single stamps rolled into a 'coil') and booklet stamps (i.e., six stamps to a leaflet). There were three printings, or series, of stamps released on succeeding dates, the average series being released over the course of approximately two years. The 26 different subject themes employed for this issue were used to print more than 75 distinct postage stamp issues in three separate series over a ten-year period.

Stamp charts

<div style="background-color:white; border:solid 2px steelblue">

A second attempt at overprinting for commemorative purposes was also done in 1928, for the sesquicentennial of the Battle of Monmouth.  This time just the 2¢ Washington received the name of the alleged hero of the battle, Molly Pitcher.

Public reaction to the overprints was generally poor, the consensus being they were cheaply made. No more issues were produced in this or subsequent series.

Oddities of the issue: coil waste and sheet waste stamps
There are a few stamps of this series—all dating from 1923—with features that set them apart from the normal sheet stamps discussed and charted above, although at first glance they may seem identical to the standard products. Ranging from moderately to extremely rare, these are so-called "coil waste" and "sheet waste" issues. That is to say, they were produced from stamps left over after the long rotary-printed rolls of paper had been cut into normal sized coils or sheets (the roll ends being too small to be processed for coils or sheets with the standard equipment). Although these stamps closely resemble the standard flat-plate press sheet issues, their designs are somewhat longer or wider than normal because rotary printing stretches the image slightly.

Coil waste:
 1¢ and 2¢ stamps perforated 10 vertically by 11 horizontally (made from horizontal coil printings).
 1¢ and 2¢ stamps perforated 11 (made from horizontal coil printings) Only 106 copies are known of this 1¢ issue.

Sheet waste (made from vertical rotary printings intended for perforated 10 sheets):
 1¢ rotary press printing, perforated 11 (only 13 copies known)
 2¢ Harding memorial rotary press printing, perforated 11 (already discussed above; only 50 copies known). Although not technically part of the series, this issue deserves mention here as a contemporary sheet waste example.
These sheet waste stamps are both so rare that their existence was still undiscovered when Max Johl completed his exhaustive three-volume study The United States Postage Stamps of the Twentieth Century in 1937.

Duration of usage
The Regular Issues were released over a ten-year period and, with the exception of one stamp, were the only definitives in general use until 1938 when the Post Office offered the Presidential Issue. The exception, released on June 15, 1932, in anticipation of the impending rate increase on standard letters from 2¢ to 3¢, scheduled for July 6, was a 3¢ Washington regular issue stamp. Rather than designing this hurried production entirely from scratch, the Bureau of Engraving and Printing modified the 2¢ stamp from the Washington Bicentennial Issue which had been released at the beginning of the year, and already looked like a definitive. The Bureau needed only to change the numerals, to remove the stamp's sole commemorative feature (the date ribbons surrounding the portrait) and to print the stamp in the purple ink traditionally used for the 3¢ denomination. The result was that a Washington definitive issue for the normal letter rate—an invariable feature of American postage since 1870—remained continuously available to the public. The 3¢ Lincoln stamp from the 1922 series still sold widely in 1932 but disappeared from post offices the following year, prompting such protests that the Bureau had to reprint it from new plates in early 1934. During the six years following the final release of the regular issue in 1932, a steady stream of 3¢ commemoratives appeared which helped to meet the basic postal needs of the country. The Regular Issues of 1922-1931 are among the longest-running issues of definitive postage, for their duration of common usage (sixteen years) exceeded that of the Washington-Franklin issues of (1908–1922) and is surpassed only by the Presidential Issue, which appeared in 1938 and was only partially replaced in 1954, with several denominations remaining available for several years thereafter.

See also

 Presidents of the United States on U.S. postage stamps
 Postage stamps and postal history of the United States
 Stamp collecting

References

Further reading
 Scott Identification Guide Of US Regular Issue Stamps 1847-1934, by Charles N. Micarelli, 2006
 The United States Coil Issues, Martin A. Armstrong, 1979

External links 
 Statue of Freedom
 Kansas and Nebraska Overprint Issues (1929)
 The Washington-Franklin Issues, Smithsonian National Postal Museum
 Second Bureau Issue, 1902, Smithsonian National Postal Museum
 Fourth Bureau Issue, 1922, Smithsonian National Postal Museum
 STAMPDATA

Postage stamps of the United States
Postal history of the United States